In mathematics, Delta-convergence, or Δ-convergence, is a mode of convergence in metric spaces, weaker than the usual metric convergence, and similar to (but distinct from) the weak convergence in Banach spaces. In Hilbert space, Delta-convergence and weak convergence coincide. For a general class of spaces, similarly to weak convergence, every bounded sequence has a Delta-convergent subsequence.  
Delta convergence was first introduced by Teck-Cheong Lim, and, soon after, under the name of almost convergence, by Tadeusz Kuczumow.

Definition 
A sequence  in a metric space  is said to be  Δ-convergent to  if for every , .

Characterization in Banach spaces 
In particular, Delta-convergence and weak convergence coincide if  is a Hilbert space.

Opial property 
Coincidence of weak convergence and Delta-convergence is equivalent, for uniformly convex Banach spaces, to the well-known 
Opial property

Delta-compactness theorem 
The Delta-compactness theorem of T. C. Lim states that if  is an asymptotically complete metric space, then every bounded sequence in  has a Delta-convergent subsequence.

The Delta-compactness theorem is similar to the Banach–Alaoglu theorem for weak convergence but, unlike the Banach-Alaoglu theorem (in the non-separable case) its proof does not depend on the Axiom of Choice.

Asymptotic center and asymptotic completeness 
An asymptotic center of a sequence , if it exists, is a limit of the Chebyshev centers   for truncated sequences . A metric space is called asymptotically complete, if any bounded sequence in it has an asymptotic center.

Uniform convexity as sufficient condition of asymptotic completeness 
Condition of asymptotic completeness in the Delta-compactness theorem is satisfied by uniformly convex Banach spaces, and more generally, by uniformly rotund metric spaces as defined by J. Staples.

Further reading 
William Kirk, Naseer Shahzad, Fixed point theory in distance spaces. Springer, Cham, 2014. xii+173 pp.
 G. Devillanova, S. Solimini, C. Tintarev, On weak convergence in metric spaces, Nonlinear Analysis and Optimization (B. S. Mordukhovich, S. Reich, A. J. Zaslavski, Editors), 43–64, Contemporary Mathematics 659, AMS, Providence, RI, 2016.

References

Theorems in functional analysis
Nonlinear functional analysis
Convergence (mathematics)